Enoximone (INN, trade name Perfan) is an imidazole phosphodiesterase inhibitor. It is used in the treatment of congestive heart failure and is selective for phosphodiesterase 3.

References

External links

Cardiac stimulants
Imidazolines
Inotropic agents
Ketones
Lactams
PDE3 inhibitors
Thioethers
Ureas